Bernal Jiménez Monge (8 January 1930 – 20 March 2021) was a Costa Rican economist and politician who served as MP, including a spell as Minister of Economy and Finance.

References

1930 births
2021 deaths
Costa Rican politicians